Michael Luxford (born 23 February 1995) is a former professional Australian rules footballer who played for the Geelong Football Club in the Australian Football League (AFL).

Luxford was recruited by Geelong in November 2013 as a "category B" rookie, having played basketball as a junior, not football.  After playing for Geelong in the Victorian Football League throughout 2014 he was elevated to Geelong's AFL senior squad in May 2015 and made his debut against Essendon. At the conclusion of the 2016 season, he was delisted by Geelong.
He currently (2018) plays for the Geelong Supercats in the SEABL.

Statistics

|- style="background-color: #EAEAEA"
! scope="row" style="text-align:center" | 2014
|
| 37 || 0 || — || — || — || — || — || — || — || — || — || — || — || — || — || —
|- 
! scope="row" style="text-align:center" | 2015
|
| 37 || 2 || 0 || 0 || 3 || 5 || 8 || 1 || 3 || 0.0 || 0.0 || 1.5 || 2.5 || 4.0 || 0.5 || 1.5
|- style="background-color: #EAEAEA"
! scope="row" style="text-align:center" | 2016
|
| 37 || 0 || — || — || — || — || — || — || — || — || — || — || — || — || — || —
|- class="sortbottom"
! colspan=3| Career
! 2
! 0
! 0
! 3
! 5
! 8
! 1
! 3
! 0.0
! 0.0
! 1.5
! 2.5
! 4.0
! 0.5
! 1.5
|}

References

External links

1995 births
Living people
Geelong Football Club players
Australian rules footballers from Victoria (Australia)
People educated at Caulfield Grammar School